Canada–Vietnam relations refer to bilateral relations between Canada and the Socialist Republic of Vietnam. Both nations are members of the Asia-Pacific Economic Cooperation, Organisation internationale de la Francophonie and the United Nations.

History
Canada and Vietnam share a common history in the fact that both nations were part of the French colonial empire. During the Vietnam War, Canada remained officially neutral, though there had been mutual assistance periodically. However, with regards to Vietnam, itself, Canada was a member of the International Control Commission overseeing the implementation of the Geneva Agreements, and provided peace keepers in Vietnam. Casualties were suffered along the way. After the Fall of Saigon, from 1979 to 1980 Canada admitted 60,000 refugees from Vietnam.

In 1973, Canada and Vietnam established diplomatic relations. In September 1976, Vietnam opened an embassy in Ottawa, however, the embassy was closed in 1981. Vietnam reopened its embassy in Ottawa in 1990. In 1994, Canada opened a resident embassy in Hanoi.

In November 1994, Canadian Prime Minister, Jean Chrétien, paid an official visit to Vietnam, the first Canadian head-of-government to do so. In June 2005, Prime Minister, Phan Văn Khải, became the first Vietnamese head-of-state to visit Canada. Since the initial visits, there have been several high-level visits between leaders and foreign ministers of both nations.  Recent visits include Canadian Prime Minister, Justin Trudeau, paying a visit to Vietnam to attend the 29th APEC Summit in Hanoi in November 2017. In June 2018, Prime Minister Nguyễn Xuân Phúc paid a visit to Canada to attend the 44th G7 summit in La Malbaie.

In 2018, both nations celebrated 45 years of diplomatic relations.

High-level visits

High-level visits from Canada to Vietnam 
 Prime Minister Jean Chrétien (1994, 1997)
 Foreign Minister André Ouellet (1995)
 Foreign Minister John Manley (2001)
 Prime Minister Stephen Harper (2006)
 Foreign Minister Lawrence Cannon (2010)
 Governor General David Johnston (2011)
 Foreign Minister John Baird (2013)
 Foreign Minister Stéphane Dion (2016)
 Prime Minister Justin Trudeau (2017)

High-level visits from Vietnam to Canada 
 Deputy Prime Minister Phan Văn Khải (1994)
 Foreign Minister Nguyen Manh Cam (1998)
 Prime Minister Phan Văn Khải (2005)
 Deputy Prime Minister Truong Vinh Trong (2007)
 Vice President Nguyễn Thị Doan (2008)
 Foreign Minister Phạm Gia Khiêm (2009)
 Prime Minister Nguyễn Tấn Dũng (2010)
 Foreign Minister Phạm Bình Minh (2014)
 Prime Minister Nguyễn Xuân Phúc (2018)

Bilateral agreements
Both nations have signed several agreements such as an Agreement on Economic and Technological Cooperation between Vietnam and Quebec (1992); Agreement on Development Cooperation (1994); Agreement on Trade and Commerce (1995); Agreement on the Avoidance of Double Taxation and the Prevention of Fiscal Evasion with Respect to Taxes on Income (1997); Memorandum of Understanding on Service and Infrastructure Development (2000); Memorandum of Understanding on Project of Assistance Policy (2001); Agreement on Aviation Transportation (2004); and an Agreement on Adoption (2005).

Trade
In 2018, Canada and Vietnam signed the Comprehensive and Progressive Agreement for Trans-Pacific Partnership, along with other nations along the Pacific Rim. In 2018, two-way trade between both nations totaled US$6.4 billion. Vietnam has been Canada's largest trading partner in the ASEAN region since 2015. The priority areas in Vietnam for Canadian commercial interests are agriculture and agri-food, education, information and communication technologies, clean technology, infrastructure, and aerospace.

Resident diplomatic missions

 Canada has an embassy in Hanoi and a consulate-general in Ho Chi Minh City.
 Vietnam has an embassy in Ottawa and a consulate-general in Vancouver.

See also 
 Phan Thi Kim Phuc
 Vietnamese Canadians

References 

 
Vietnam
Bilateral relations of Vietnam